The 1962–63 NHL season was the 46th season of the National Hockey League. Six teams each played 70 games. The Toronto Maple Leafs won their second Stanley Cup in a row as they defeated the Detroit Red Wings four games to one.

Regular season
Some diversionary news hit the sports pages the day of the All-Star Game when it was reported that Toronto had sold Frank Mahovlich to Chicago for $1 million and James D. Norris produced a cheque for the amount. On the advice of Conn Smythe, Leafs general manager and head coach Punch Imlach declined the deal, saying that a million dollars does not score goals, and Mahovlich would remain a Maple Leaf.

A serious incident took place on October 23 between the Montreal Canadiens and Chicago Black Hawks. A vicious stick-swinging duel took place between Gilles Tremblay and Reg Fleming that was said to be the worst since the Bernie Geoffrion-Ron Murphy fight in 1953. Both players received match penalties and $100 fines. Tremblay emerged with a bad cut on his head that required many stitches. Montreal coach Toe Blake had some caustic remarks for Fleming when he was leaving the ice, which almost resulted in another fight. The Canadiens and Black Hawks played to a 4–4 tie. President Clarence Campbell suspended both Tremblay and Fleming for three games.

Glenn Hall's consecutive game streak came to an end on November 8 when he suffered a pinched nerve in his back and he was relieved by Denis DeJordy in the first period of a game in which Hall's Black Hawks tied Boston 3–3. DeJordy played well in the next game as the Black Hawks beat the Canadiens 3–1.

Chicago was improving and moved into a first-place tie with Detroit when they blanked Boston 5–0 on November 29. Stan Mikita scored two goals and Bobby Hull had one. The same night, the Rangers shut out the Red Wings 5–0 as Gump Worsley played a fine game. Worsley was unlucky in his next game, however, as Chicago beat the Rangers 5–1. Worsley badly injured his shoulder and had to be replaced by Marcel Pelletier. Gump went to the hospital where he would have his shoulder in traction for ten days.

Andy Hebenton had the hat trick on December 16 as the Rangers beat Detroit 5–2 at Madison Square Garden. The game was spoiled by a brawl, the chief participants being Dave Balon, Bill Gadsby, Doug Barkley and Terry Sawchuk. All were fined.

Andy Bathgate got both goals when the Rangers tied Montreal 2–2 at the Montreal Forum on January 5. This was the tenth consecutive game in which he had scored. The streak was terminated when Jacques Plante blanked the Rangers 6–0 in New York.

Jean Beliveau scored his 300th NHL goal on January 26 when the Rangers beat the Canadiens 4–2 at the Forum. Goals had not come very fast this year, and he hinted that this might be his last season. The writers did not take him seriously, however. The next night, the Canadiens beat the Black Hawks 3–1 at Chicago Stadium and Beliveau scored a spectacular goal, giving a beautiful exhibition of stick-handling.

Bernie Geoffrion and Don Marshall were back on January 31, but the Canadiens lost 6–3 to Toronto at the Forum. Coach Toe Blake was not pleased with the officiating and was quoted in a French newspaper that referee Eddie Powers handled the game as if he had bet on the outcome. This attracted the attention of NHL president Clarence Campbell, who said the matter would be investigated. Later, Blake was fined $200 by Campbell. Powers considered the fine inadequate and submitted his resignation as a referee. He cited Red Storey when Campbell would not support decisions he made. Powers then sued Blake for libel.

Bobby Hull scored all three goals as Chicago beat Boston 3–1 on February 17. On the same night, Montreal beat Detroit 6–1 and Howie Young established a penalty record when he high-sticked a Canadiens player and then commenced a tantrum, which drew him a minor, a major, a misconduct and a game misconduct totalling 27 minutes. His season total was now 208 minutes in penalties. NHL president Campbell then tacked on a three-game suspension.

Detroit ousted the Rangers from the playoffs on March 3 with a 3–2 win.

Bernie Geoffrion was in trouble for an incident during a game on March 5 in which Montreal beat Detroit 4–3. Referee Vern Buffey had given Jacques Plante a penalty for slashing Howie Young and then a bench penalty when the Canadiens protested. Geoffrion threw his stick at Buffey and his gloves as well. Geoffrion was given a match penalty and President Campbell assessed Geoffrion a five-game suspension.

The career of the Canadiens' Lou Fontinato came to a tragic end on March 9 when he tried to check Vic Hadfield and instead was thrown headlong into the boards by the Ranger player. Fontinato lay motionless on the ice for some time before being carried off the ice on a stretcher and taken to Montreal General Hospital where the diagnosis was a fractured neck, a crushed cervical vertebra. He gradually recovered from his paralyzed condition, but would never play hockey again. Jacques Laperriere replaced Fontinato on the Canadiens defence.

It was quite a race for playoff positions, as five points separated fourth and first. Gordie Howe led the Red Wings and the NHL as he won his sixth and last Art Ross Trophy and Hart Trophy.

Final standings

Playoffs

Playoff bracket

Semifinals

(1) Toronto Maple Leafs vs. (3) Montreal Canadiens

(2) Chicago Black Hawks vs. (4) Detroit Red Wings

Stanley Cup Finals

Awards

All-Star teams

Player statistics

Scoring leaders
Note: GP = Games played, G = Goals, A = Assists, Pts = Points, PIM = Penalties in minutes

Leading goaltenders

Note: GP = Games played; Min – Minutes played; GA = Goals against; GAA = Goals against average; W = Wins; L = Losses; T = Ties; SO = Shutouts

Coaches
Boston Bruins: Milt Schmidt
Chicago Black Hawks: Rudy Pilous
Detroit Red Wings: Sid Abel
Montreal Canadiens: Toe Blake
New York Rangers: Muzz Patrick and Red Sullivan
Toronto Maple Leafs: Punch Imlach

Debuts
The following is a list of players of note who played their first NHL game in 1962–63 (listed with their first team, asterisk(*) marks debut in playoffs):
Eddie Johnston, Boston Bruins
Paul Henderson, Detroit Red Wings
Claude Larose, Montreal Canadiens
Jacques Laperriere, Montreal Canadiens
Terry Harper, Montreal Canadiens
Jim Neilson, New York Rangers
Kent Douglas, Toronto Maple Leafs

Last games
The following is a list of players of note who played their last game in the NHL in 1962–63 (listed with their last team):
Bob Turner, Chicago Black Hawks
Jack Evans, Chicago Black Hawks
Vic Stasiuk, Detroit Red Wings
Lou Fontinato, Montreal Canadiens

See also 
 1962-63 NHL transactions
 List of Stanley Cup champions
 National Hockey League All-Star Game
 1962 in sports
 1963 in sports

References 

 
 
 

 

 

 
Notes

External links
 Hockey Database
 NHL.com

 
1962–63 in American ice hockey by league
1962–63 in Canadian ice hockey by league